The Burling Row House District is a historic district in Chicago, Illinois, United States.  The district was built in the post-Chicago Fire year of 1875 by Edward J. Burling. It was designated a Chicago Landmark on November 15, 2000.

References

Historic districts in Chicago
Chicago Landmarks